The discography of the Japanese idol group Cute consists of 23* singles, 7 studio albums, and 1 compilation album. Beginning with the Cute's major debut back in 2007, all its singles* reached the Top 10 in the Oricon Weekly Chart.

* Not counting two special singles that were intended for limited distribution only.

Discography 
The following CDs and DVDs are released on the Zetima label.

Singles 

* Billboard Japan Hot 100 is published since January 2008.
*** These are unofficial figures obtained by adding together Oricon sales numbers for different periods of time when the single charted on Oricon.

Albums

DVDs

Fan club 
Many DVDs were released to the official fan club and were officially only obtainable by mail order for a limited time.
Cute DVD Magazine Vol. 1
Cute DVD Magazine Vol. 2
Cute DVD Magazine Vol. 3
Cute DVD Magazine Vol. 4
Cute DVD Magazine Vol. 5
Cute DVD Magazine Vol. 6
Cute DVD Magazine Vol. 7
Cute DVD Magazine Vol. 8
Cute DVD Magazine Vol. 9
Cute DVD Magazine Vol. 10
Cute DVD Magazine Vol. 11
Cute DVD Magazine Vol. 12
Cute DVD Magazine Vol. 13
Cute DVD Magazine Vol. 14
Cute DVD Magazine Vol. 15
Cute DVD Magazine Vol. 16
Cute DVD Magazine Vol. 17
Cute DVD Magazine Vol. 18
Cute DVD Magazine Vol. 19
Cute DVD Magazine Vol. 20
Cute DVD Magazine Vol. 21
Cute DVD Magazine Vol. 22
Cute DVD Magazine Vol. 23
Cute DVD Magazine Vol. 24
Cute DVD Magazine Vol. 25
Cute DVD Magazine Vol. 26
Cute DVD Magazine Vol. 27
Cute DVD Magazine Vol. 28
Cute DVD Magazine Vol. 29
Cute DVD Magazine Vol. 30
Cute DVD Magazine Vol. 31

Blu-ray discs

Filmography

Radio 
 Cutie Party – FM-Fuji, Saturdays 23:00-23:30 JST (Yajima, Suzuki & Okai, since October 7, 2006 to September 27, 2008) as the opening portion of Hello! Project Night
 Cute Cutie Paradise ℃-ute キューティー☆パラダイス Cute Cutie Paradise – Radio Nihon, Tuesdays 21:30-22:00 JST (Umeda & Suzuki, since November 5, 2008)

Bibliography

Photobooks 
Berryz Kobo & Cute in Hello! Project 2006 Summer (Released September 21, 2006)
So Cute! – Cute first photobook (February 21, 2007)
Hajimattayo! Cutie Show – Cute debut solo concert live photobook (April 11, 2007)
Moving down through Japan! Travel Diary of Cute in 2007 Summer – photobook of Cutie Circuit 2007: Magical Cutie Tour (October 4, 2007)

Footnotes

References

External links
 Official discography at helloproject.com
 Oricon rankings

Cute official YouTube channel
 Cute official YouTube channel

Music videos
Indie
1. Cute "Massara Blue Jeans" (1st indie single)
2. Cute "Soku Dakishimete" (2nd indie single)
3. Cute "Ookina Ai de Motenashite" (3rd indie single)
4. Cute "Wakkyanai (Z)" (Live Version) (4th indie single)
Major
1. Cute "Sakura Chirari" (1st single)
2. Cute "Meguru Koi no Kisetsu" (2nd single)
3. Cute "Tokaikko Junjō" (3rd single)
4. Cute "Lalala Shiawase no Uta" (4th single)
-. Cute "Koero! Rakuten Eagles" (Cute Ver.) (special single)
5. Cute "Namida no Iro" (5th single)
6. Cute "Edo no Temari Uta II" (6th single)
7. Cute "Forever Love" (7th single)
8. Cute "Bye Bye Bye!" (8th single)
9. Cute "Shochū Omimai Mōshiagemasu" (9th single)
10. Cute "Everyday Zekkōchō" (10th single)
11. Cute "Shock!" (11th single)
-. Cute "Shigatsu Sengen"
12. Cute "Campus Life: Umarete Kite Yokatta" (12th single)
13. Cute "Dance de Bakōn" (13th single)
14. Cute "Aitai Lonely Christmas" (14th single)
15. Cute "Kiss me Aishiteru" (15th single)
16. Cute "Momoiro Sparkling" (16th single)
17. Cute "Sekaiichi Happy na Onna no Ko" (17th single)
18. Cute "Kimi wa Jitensha Watashi wa Densha de Kitaku" (18th single)
19. Cute "Aitai Aitai Aitai na" (19th single)
20. Cute "Kono Machi" (20th single)
21. Cute "Crazy Kanzen na Otona" (21st single)

discography
Discographies of Japanese artists
Pop music group discographies